Tecmerium spermophagia is a moth in the family Blastobasidae. It is found in Portugal and Spain.

The wingspan is 14–17 mm. The forewings are whitish cinereous (ash-grey), dusted with brownish grey. The hindwings are shining pale brownish grey.

Larvae have been reared from seed-whorls of Phlomis purpurea.

References

Moths described in 1907
Blastobasidae